The men's snooker team tournament at the 1998 Asian Games in Thailand took place from 12 December to 14 December at Land Sports Complex.

Results

Quarterfinals

Semifinals

3rd place match

Final

References 
Results

External links 
Asian Confederation of Billiards Sports

Cue sports at the 1998 Asian Games